The 1997 World Men's Handball Championship was the 15th team handball World Championship. It was held in Kumamoto, Japan and was the first World Championship not played in a European country. Russia won the championship.

Qualification

Venues 

The organizing committee used four venues to host the 1997 World Men's Handball Championship:

 Group A: Park Dome Kumamoto
 Group B: Kumamoto City Gym
 Group C: Yamaga City Gym
 Group D: Yatsushiro City Gym

Preliminary round
The top 4 placed teams of each group continues to the knockout stage. The teams are ranked through the following rules.
Team with the most points (2 points for each won game, 1 point for each drawn game).
If two teams get the same points, the winner in the game between the two teams get ranked first.
If the game between the teams ended in a draw, the team with the best goal difference get ranked first.

Group A

Group B

Group C

Group D

Final round

Bracket

Round of 16

Quarter-finals

Placement matches

7th place match

5th place match

Semi-finals

Bronze final

Final

Final standings

Medalists

All Star Team
 Goalkeeper: Mats Olsson 
 Left Wing: Valery Gopin 
 Left Back: Vasily Kudinov 
 Center Back: Talant Duyshebaev 
 Pivot: Guéric Kervadec 
 Right Back: Staffan Olsson 
 Right Wing: Valdimar Grímsson

References

External links 
Official report
WC97 by todor66

World Handball Championship tournaments
Handball
International handball competitions hosted by Japan
Handball
May 1997 sports events in Asia
June 1997 sports events in Asia
Sport in Kumamoto Prefecture